Stuart McQuarrie (born 19 March 1963) is a Scottish actor who has starred in several acclaimed films, including Trainspotting and 28 Days Later. Besides numerous film and TV appearances McQuarrie has performed extensively in theatre throughout the UK.

Biography
McQuarrie trained at the Royal Scottish Academy of Music and Drama (RSAMD) in Glasgow and soon became a highly popular actor amongst Edinburgh theatre goers before moving to London, where he has played prominent roles in more controversial, new dramas by playwrights such as Sarah Kane and Anthony Neilson, amongst others. In 2006 McQuarrie returned to Edinburgh, where he played himself in the critically acclaimed National Theatre of Scotland production of Realism by Anthony Neilson, for which he won the Glasgow Herald Angel award and was nominated for Best Male Actor by CATS (Critics Awards for Theatre in Scotland). Charles Spencer of the Daily Telegraph wrote: "Stuart McQuarrie plays Stuart, and since Neilson, who directs his own work with panache, writes most of his plays during the rehearsal period, one wonders just how much the character is based on the actor playing him. He certainly brings a delightful, rueful quality to a man who can't make a piece of toast without burning it, or have a sexual fantasy without his mother interrupting the scenario."

Film

Television

Theatre

References

External links

1963 births
Scottish male film actors
Scottish male television actors
Scottish male stage actors
Scottish male Shakespearean actors
Living people